Kevin W. Fitzgerald Park (formerly Puddingstone Park) is a  neighborhood park near Brigham Circle in the Mission Hill neighborhood of Boston, Massachusetts. It was built as part of the redevelopment of the "ledge site", a former Puddingstone quarry. It is accessible from a stairway from a nearby parking lot, with a winding pathway leading upwards to a view of greater Boston.

On November 18, 2006, the park was renamed in honor of Kevin W. Fitzgerald, a state representative for 27 years, a youth advocate, and cofounder of the Center for the Study of Sport in Society at nearby Northeastern University.  It borders Brigham Circle below, the traffic intersection and a commercial development by the same name, which includes retail sites for Stop and Shop and Walgreens, Mission Hill Neighborhood Housing Services (which had engaged neighboring institutions, government, and others for funding for the development), and some administrative offices for the Brigham and Women's Hospital.

References

External links
Mission Hill Neighborhood Housing Services - Kevin W. Fitzgerald Park

Parks in Boston
Landmarks in Mission Hill, Boston